Campus, formerly named MTI College, is a private community college in Sacramento, California.  Founded in 1965, it focuses on education in the fields of information technology, law, business, health care, and cosmetology. The college has been accredited by the Accrediting Commission for Community and Junior Colleges of the Western Association of Schools and Colleges since 1999. According to US News & World Report, in 2018 Campus had a total enrollment of 787 students. The Department of Education's College Scorecard database reports that Campus has a 71% graduation rate.

References

External links
Official website

Education in Sacramento, California
Educational institutions established in 1965
Schools accredited by the Western Association of Schools and Colleges
Private universities and colleges in California
1965 establishments in California
Community colleges
Universities and colleges in Sacramento County, California